Leah Remini: Scientology and the Aftermath is an American documentary series that investigates the Church of Scientology through the experiences of American actress Leah Remini and other former members. She was a follower of Scientology between 1979, when she joined at the age of nine alongside her parents, and 2013, when she left under acrimonious circumstances. She subsequently became an outspoken critic of Scientology and published a bestselling memoir, Troublemaker: Surviving Hollywood and Scientology, in 2015.

The show's first season was aired by A&E in seven regular and three special episodes commencing November 29, 2016. It received positive reviews from critics, recorded A&E's best premiere ratings since 2014 and maintained a consistently high viewership for subsequent episodes. The first season garnered two Emmy nominations, scoring one win. The series was renewed for a second season of ten regular and four special episodes commencing August 15, 2017. The Church of Scientology was extremely critical of Remini and the show and established several websites attacking the show, its presenters and many of the interviewees.

On August 26, 2019, the series ended with a two-hour special.

Overview
In each 43-minute episode, Remini and co-host Mike Rinder investigate what A&E calls "shocking stories of abuse, heartbreak and harassment experienced by those who have left the church and spoken publicly about their experiences". She interviews former members of the church who describe their experiences with Scientology and how they have continued to be affected by it even after leaving. She also speaks with a number of former high-ranking church officials who explain the background to the church's policies and organization, and how this relates to the experiences of ex-members.

In a statement issued by A&E, Remini explained the purpose of her series. She said that she hoped to "shed light on information that makes the world aware of what is really going on and encourages others to speak up so the abuses can be ended forever. I hope that people who have left now feel they have a safe place to go. I hope others who have also experienced abuses will come forward and help us to do something about it."

As part of the pre-broadcast publicity, Remini hosted an "Ask Me Anything" on Reddit in which she explained her views on Scientology and discussed the show. It received nearly 20,000 comments and prompted two similarly themed special episodes to be added to the show's schedule in December 2016 and January 2017.

Production
The series was developed by Remini following the 2015 publication of her memoir Troublemaker: Surviving Hollywood and Scientology. After several former Scientologists contacted her in the wake of the book's release, she decided to shoot a teaser based on the story of one family and approached a number of producers to obtain backing for production. When she spoke with Eli Holzman and Aaron Saidman of The Intellectual Property Corporation, she says that she told them: "Don't be pussies. If you're going to be pussies, you're not the right producers for this." According to Holzman, "Aaron and I huddled and said, 'Are we pussies?'". They decided that they were not, took on the project and facilitated talks with A&E. Explaining why he decided to produce the series, Holzman said: "We're not pro-Scientology or anti-Scientology. We're just documentarians who take the facts as they come to us and investigate every lead as best we can."

Scientology and the Aftermath was mostly filmed over the summer of 2016. Remini served as executive producer for her company, No Seriously Productions, with Holzman and Saidman co-producing. Alex Weresow was the series' showrunner and another executive producer.

An extra episode, titled "Ask Me Anything", was added to the series schedule after its broadcast run started and premiered on December 19. It was filmed over the course of the preceding week in reaction to the ratings success of the opening episode. A second "Ask Me Anything" special was broadcast on January 17, 2017. Another special episode was aired after the end of the first season, titled "Merchants of Fear".

Following the ratings success of the first season, a second, ten-episode season was announced by A&E in March 2017, which premiered August 15, 2017. Executive production was again handled by Remini and her company No Seriously Productions, with Eli Holzman and Aaron Saidman of The Intellectual Property Corp also executive producing. Remini said in a statement: "The show is really about standing up for what is right and not letting bullies have their way. I feel it is important for people to know that you can take action to bring about change, both for yourself and for others."

Remini said that after the first season aired, many people contacted her and Mike Rinder to tell their own stories of abuse in Scientology. She had not originally intended to make a second season, but went ahead following what Holzman called a "deluge of people emboldened to come forward". He said that the team was "sitting on some really damning and actionable material and can't wait to premiere."

Episodes and broadcast history

Series overview

Season 1 (2016–17)
The first season comprises seven episodes broadcast on Tuesday nights, plus two episodes added to the schedules for the night of Monday, December 19, 2016 and Tuesday, January 17, 2017, as well as a two-hour special aired on May 29, 2017.

The show's seven original episodes (minus the three specials) have also been broadcast in Europe on the satellite TV Crime & Investigation Network (Europe), commencing March 11, 2017, and in South East Asia on the Crime & Investigation Network (South East Asia) commencing April 2017.

Season 2 (2017)
The second season contained ten regular and four special episodes, broadcasting on Tuesday nights commencing August 15, 2017.

Season 3 (2018–19)
On March 14, 2018, A&E announced that the series would return for a third season. On November 13, 2018, A&E aired a special two-hour episode titled Scientology and the Aftermath: The Jehovah's Witnesses in which Remini and Rinder investigate the similarities between Jehovah's Witnesses and Scientology, followed by a second special episode about the "Emotional Aftermath" of Scientology on Leah and Mike's families, broadcast November 18, 2018. The first regular episode of the third season premiered on November 27, 2018.

Series Finale (2019)

Reception

Reviews
The show attracted moderately positive reviews for its first episode, though some reviewers questioned its likely impact. The Hollywood Reporter described it as "interesting, but unlikely to generate a following", commenting that while it would "stir up some viewer emotions" its format was not very dynamic, with "a lot of sitting around talking, interspersed with footage from fairly innocuous Scientology promotional videos and event interviews." Newsday felt that in the light of previous Scientology exposés such as the book and film Going Clear and Remini's own earlier book, "almost nothing here feels fresh or unexpected." The Los Angeles Times called it "a compelling, if unsophisticated, investigation" of Scientology and described its focus on harmed families "an effective strategy that will likely resonate with many viewers." Writing in The Atlantic, Sophie Gilbert highlighted Remini's ability to reach broader audiences and called the show "a valuable continuation of efforts to shed light on some of [Scientology's] most egregious practices".

CNN saw the show as "a step up in class for A&E" that delivers "a sobering warning to those who might be susceptible to the [Scientology] sales pitch". While acknowledging the repetitive nature of Remini "hearing the same story over and over again", The Huffington Post commented that "under normal circumstances, the same story over eight episodes would make for a tedious and boring show, but "Aftermath" is telling a horror story, and the repetition is powerful." Salon suggested that the show's best asset was "Remini's honest anger and frustration, both of which blaze across the screen in reaction to particularly damning revelations", but wondered who the show's audience was meant to be and questioned the extent of its appeal: "It is hard to fathom anyone other than the most hard-core obsessives sticking around to watch all eight installments of this limited series."

By the end of the first season's run, it had attracted critical praise as well as strong viewer numbers. Describing it as a "Peak TV Treasure", Kimberly Roots of TVLine commented that "If you heard about the docu-series and quickly dismissed it as a pathetic cash-grab on Remini's part (like I did at first), it's worth a second look." The Straits Times called it "riveting television" for telling the "remarkable" stories of its interviewees.

The first season received a 78% rating on Rotten Tomatoes.

Awards and nominations

Scientology reaction
The Church of Scientology was critical of the series. Prior to broadcast, it issued a 530-word statement attacking Remini. The church's statement alleged that she was spreading lies about the Church of Scientology along with claims that former Scientologists who participate in the show were kicked out. It established a website dedicated to attempting to discredit the series, and its lawyers also sought to force A&E to abandon the planned broadcast of the show. In response, Remini demanded that the church pay her $1.5 million in damages for past and present reputational, emotional, and economic injuries. When Remini appeared on Conan on January 25, 2017, to promote Scientology and the Aftermath, the Church sent the show's host Conan O'Brien a personal letter seeking to discredit her – something that O'Brien says had never before happened in his 24 years of hosting late-night talk shows.

At the start of each segment, statements appear on-screen describing the church's dispute of the material presented and its refusal to participate in the series. Excerpts from letters written by the church, attacking the credibility of Remini and her interview subjects, are also displayed and read in a move that Salon described as an attempt to "appease the notoriously litigious church".

The premiere of the second season prompted an Indian Scientologist to start a petition on Change.org calling on A&E to cancel the show, claiming that it was "a type of hate-show made to create violence, with false claims, showing a totally negative side of Scientology. This is total criminal! Ban it!". Scientologists Taking Action Against Discrimination (STAND), a front group for the church, circulated form letters to its parishioners for them to send to A&E's advertisers asking them to disown the show for its "religious hate and bigotry which leads to violence". A Scientology spokesperson claimed that the show had led to "violent acts and death threats against the church." An ex-Scientologist also circulated a petition calling on the U.S. government to review the tax status of Scientology in the United States and revoke its tax exemption.

Ratings
The first episode of the show was a major ratings success for A&E, attracting 2.1 million viewers. This represented the network's most successful  premiere since Big Smo in 2014, and substantially exceeded the 1.65 million who watched the premiere of HBO's Scientology documentary film Going Clear in March 2015. The ratings for the subsequent episodes were lower but held steady at between 1.4 and 0.9 million viewers.

The second season's first two episodes produced ratings of 1.4 million viewers, down from the first season, but reflecting August's typically lower number of viewers.

References

External links
 
 

2010s American documentary television series
2010s American television miniseries
2016 American television series debuts
2016 in religion
2019 American television series endings
A&E (TV network) original programming
English-language television shows
Scientology in popular culture
Television series about cults
Works critical of Scientology